Yelda or Yalda might refer to the Yaldā Night holiday. Yelda and Yalda is also a surname and a female given name. The name may refer to:

People

First name
Yalda Hakim (born 1983), Australian journalist 
Yelda Reynaud (born 1972), Turkish-Austrian actress

Surname
Albert Edward Ismail Yelda (born 1959), Iraqi diplomat
Tony Yalda (born 1981), American actor

References

Turkish feminine given names